Shahr-e Forudgahi-e Imam Khomeini Metro Station, also referred to as Imam Khomeini Airport Metro Station, is a station on Tehran Metro Line 1, its extension. It is adjacent to Tehran Imam Khomeini International Airport. The station serves the airport and the surrounding, related facilities. It is currently the southern terminus. The line is intended to be continued towards Parand.

References

Tehran Metro stations